Napa State Hospital is a psychiatric hospital in Napa, California, founded in 1875. It is located along California State Route 221, the Napa-Vallejo Highway, and is one of California's five state mental hospitals. Napa State Hospital holds civil and forensic mental patients in a sprawling 138-acre campus. According to a hospital spokesperson, there were 2,338 people employed at the facility during the 2016 to 2017 fiscal year, making it one of the region's largest employers.

The Napa Valley Cricket Club played a number of their matches at McGrath Field, a multi-use sports field, at the eastern end of the hospital campus for the 2017 season.

History 

The property was originally part of Rancho Tulucay, a part of a Mexican Land Grant, sold by Cayetano Juárez to the State of California in 1872.

Originally named Napa Insane Asylum, the facility opened on November 15, 1875. The facility was originally built to relieve overcrowding at Stockton Asylum. By the early 1890s, the facility had over 1,300 patients which was more than double the original capacity it was designed to house. In 1893, the Mendocino State Hospital was opened and relieved some of the overcrowding at the Napa hospital.

The original main building known as "the Castle" was an ornate and imposing building constructed with bricks. Facilities on the property included a large farm that included dairy and poultry ranches, vegetable garden, and fruit orchards that provided a large part of the food supply consumed by the residents. The castle's main building was torn down after World War II.

This hospital was one of the many state asylums that had sterilization centers. Approximately 4,000 former patients are buried in a field at this hospital, and about 1,400 people were buried at the Sonoma Regional Center (now North Bay Regional Center).

In 1978, this hospital was the site of the Cramps concert, when several patients attempted to escape.

Notable patients 
 Edward Charles Allawaymass murderer; transferred to Napa in 2016
 Richard Allen Davismurderer and career criminal; was sent to Napa after faking a suicide attempt so he could escape in 1976
 Charles E. Huberbusinessman; was admitted after increasingly bizarre and violent behavior
 Chol Soo Leeimmigrant accused of murder; was admitted following a suicide attempt while incarcerated in 1966
 Eddie Machenboxer; admitted for threatening suicide in 1962
 Earle Nelsonserial killer; was sent to Napa several times and escaped prior to his killings
 Henry Peaveycook and valet for William Desmond Taylor; was admitted after being diagnosed with syphilis
 Bull Perrinebaseball umpire; was admitted due to failing health and later died in Napa
 William G. SeboldGerman U.S. citizen and spy; admitted for manic depression in 1965
 Scott Harlan Thorpespree killer; sentenced to Napa
 Clarice Vancevaudeville personality; died in Napa after being admitted for failing health
 Carleton Watkinsphotographer; was admitted by his daughter

Notable staff 
 Matilda Allisoneducator who taught blind veterans at Napa
 Dorothea Dixpsychiatric reformer
 Meredith Hodgespsychiatric technician
 Thomas Story Kirkbridephysician

In popular culture
 The hospital comes up several times in The 6th Target by James Patterson and Maxine Paetro.

See also 

 Eugenics in California
 List of hospitals in California
 Matilda Allison

References

External links 

 
 This hospital in the CA Healthcare Atlas – a project by OSHPD
 Doctor Vista: Napa State Hospital profile
 Napa State Hospital – a book

Psychiatric hospitals in California
Hospitals in Napa County, California
Napa, California
History of Napa County, California
Hospital buildings completed in 1875
Kirkbride Plan hospitals
1875 establishments in California
Hospitals in the San Francisco Bay Area